Cannabis is a plant and, as hemp, a source for fibers, oil, and seed. Prior to its prohibition, U.S. politicians known for growing hemp include some of the nation's Founding Fathers and presidents. Politicians who have admitted to recreational use of the drug during prohibition include mayors, governors, members of the House of Representatives, Senators, vice presidents and presidents.

List of politicians who farmed hemp

It's not clear from the list that any of them used cannabis, rather than they just farmed hemp (which wasn't illegal, nor cannabis use), e.g. to make hemp paper, such as was used for the United States Declaration of Independence.

Parties

During prohibition
In the U.S., cannabis was initially grown for industrial reasons, though it quickly became a staple medicinal product in the early 19th century and recreational use became more prevalent during the 20th century. Harry J. Anslinger, Commissioner of the Federal Bureau of Narcotics, responded to political pressure to ban marijuana at a nationwide level. The Marihuana Tax Act of 1937 created an expensive excise tax, and included penalty provisions and elaborate rules of enforcement to which marijuana, cannabis, or hemp handlers, were subject. Mandatory sentencing and increased punishment were enacted when the United States Congress passed the Boggs Act of 1952 and the Narcotics Control Act of 1956.

During the counterculture of the 1960s, attitudes towards marijuana and drug abuse policy changed as marijuana use among "white middle-class college students" became widespread.  In Leary v. United States (1969), the Supreme Court held the Marihuana Tax Act to be unconstitutional since it violated the Fifth Amendment to the United States Constitution, privilege against self-incrimination. In response, Congress passed the Controlled Substances Act as Title II of the Comprehensive Drug Abuse Prevention and Control Act of 1970, which repealed the Marihuana Tax Act. In 1972, the National Commission on Marijuana and Drug Abuse concluded that marijuana should be decriminalized, but that public use and driving while intoxicated should remain illegal. By the end of the decade, several states had decriminalized the drug, while many others weakened their laws against cannabis use.

However, a wave of conservatism during the 1980s allowed president Ronald Reagan to accelerate the War on Drugs during his presidency, prompting anti-drug campaigns such as the "Just Say No" campaign of First Lady Nancy Reagan. Federal penalties for cultivation, possession, or transfer of marijuana were increased by the Comprehensive Crime Control Act (1984), the Anti-Drug Abuse Act (1986), and the Anti-Drug Abuse Amendment Act (1988). Since California voters passed the Proposition 215 in 1996, which legalized medical cannabis, several states have followed suit. However, United States v. Oakland Cannabis Buyers' Cooperative (2001) rejected the common-law medical necessity defense to crimes enacted under the Controlled Substances Act because Congress concluded that cannabis has "no currently accepted medical use" and Gonzales v. Raich (2005) concluded that the Commerce Clause of the Article I of the Constitution allowed the federal government to ban the use of cannabis, including medical use. Today, cannabis remains classified as a Schedule I drug under the Controlled Substances Act, and possession is punishable by up to one year in jail and a minimum fine of $1,000 for a first conviction.

Use by politicians during prohibition
Politicians who have reported using cannabis during prohibition include mayors, governors, members of the House of Representatives and Senate, and U.S. presidents and vice presidents. 

Parties

Use by judges during prohibition 
In the United States, judges and justices are traditionally considered to be of a separate class distinct from politicians. However, at least two have admitted to cannabis use.

Parties

See also
Cannabis in the United States
Legal history of cannabis in the United States
Legalization of non-medical cannabis in the United States
List of British politicians who have acknowledged cannabis use

Notes

References
General

Specific

Politicians
Cannabis-related lists
Cannabis use
United States politicians who have acknowledged cannabis use